The Aichi Ha-70 was a compound engine composed of two 1,700 hp 12-cylinder liquid-cooled  inverted V-12 Aichi Atsuta aircraft engines mounted to a common gearbox. The only aircraft powered by the Ha-70 was the Yokosuka R2Y, an Imperial Japanese Navy Air Service (IJNAS) prototype reconnaissance aircraft that was designed and built near the end of World War II.

Design and development
In common with Daimler-Benz, Aichi Kokuki KK joined two Aichi Atsuta engines to drive a single propeller through a combining gearbox in very similar fashion to the Daimler Benz DB 606 (two Daimler-Benz DB 601 engines coupled to a gearbox),

To obtain the required power the Atsuta would require up-rating by at least  horsepower; Aichi continued to improve the Atsuta 32, eventually extracting the required 

The two inverted Vee Atsuta engines were mounted side-by-side, each rotated outboard from the centre-line so that the inner banks were upright, with sufficient room between them for the exhaust manifolds. The engines were attached to a gearbox that combined the two separate engine drives into a single output shaft.

Application
Fitted to the R2Y the Ha-70 was mounted behind the pilot, requiring a long drive shaft to drive the nose-mounted gear box that mounted the six-bladed propeller.

Specifications

See also

References

Notes

Bibliography
Monogram Close-Up 13 
R. J. Francillon, Japanese Aircraft of the Pacific War (1970 Putnam & Company) SBN 370 00033 1

External links
 Wilkinson, Stephan (Jan 2003) 'With the Noise of a Stone Crusher', Popular Science
 NASM 'Aichi M6A1'

1940s aircraft piston engines